Hunt is an unincorporated community in Knox County, in the U.S. state of Ohio.

History
A former variant name was Hunt's Station. Hunt's Station had its start in 1851 when the railroad was extended to that point. A post office called Hunts Station was established in 1866, the name was changed to Hunt in 1882, and the post office closed in 1912.

References

Unincorporated communities in Knox County, Ohio
1851 establishments in Ohio
Populated places established in 1851
Unincorporated communities in Ohio